Marry Me, Mary! is a 2010 South Korean romantic comedy television series, starring Moon Geun-young, Jang Keun-suk, Kim Jae-wook and Kim Hyo-jin. It is based on the Daum webtoon of the same title by Won Soo-yeon. It aired on KBS2 from November 8, to December 28, 2010, on Mondays and Tuesdays at 21:55 for 16 episodes.

Synopsis 
Wi Mae-ri (Moon Geun-young) is a stubborn young woman with no dating experience. She looks like her late mother, but her hot temper comes straight from her deadbeat father (Park Sang-myun). Her father's business failures always make trouble, but Mae-ri still loves him. Because she can't afford college tuition, she temporarily stops attending college, and without any special skills, starts to work odd jobs. One day, driving friends around as one of those jobs, she accidentally hits musician Kang Mu-gyul (Jang Keun-suk) and over a series of events, they become friends. Mae-ri's father proposes that she marry his rich friend's son Byun Jung-in (Kim Jae-wook) to pay off their debts. She refuses; when her father won't let her, and in fact forges the couple's signatures on a marriage registration, she pretends to have already married Mu-gyul. Instead of accepting that, her father proposes a deal: spend 100 days with both of them and afterwards, she can decide who she wants to marry. And from there, a love triangle forms...

Cast

Main 
 Moon Geun-young as Wi Mae-ri, Dae-han's daughter who has her father's hot temper and her mother's looks
 Jang Keun-suk as Kang Mu-gyul, Absolute Perfection lead singer and guitarist and Seo-joon's ex-boyfriend
 Kim Jae-wook as Byun Jung-in, head representative of JI Entertainment, a well-known drama company
 Kim Hyo-jin as Seo-joon, actress, Mu-gyul's ex-girlfriend

Supporting
 Park Jun-gyu as Jung-suk, Jung-in's father
 Park Sang-myun as Wi Dae-han, Mae-ri's father
 Lee Ah-hyun as Kam So-young, Mu-gyul's mother
 Shim Yi-young as Director Bang, Mu-gyul's former agent
 Lee Seon-ho as Lee An, male lead actor of drama Wonderful Day
 Kim Min-gyu as Ri-no, band member
 Geum Ho-suk as Yo-han, band member
 Park Chul-hyun as Re-oh, band member
 Lee Eun as So-ra as Mae-ri's friend
 Kim Hae-rim as Ji-hye as Mae-ri's friend
 Chae Min-hee as Jang PD
 Yoon Yoo-sun as drama writer

Production 
 Writer In Eun-ah left the drama due to its low ratings and discord with the production team. She was replaced with Go Bong-hwang, who took over the script from episode 11, which aired on December 14. The last episode was written by Jang Keun-suk.
 Co-stars Jang Keun-suk and Moon Geun-young held fan meetings on August 18 and 23, 2011 in Tokyo and Osaka, respectively, which were attended by 60,000 people.

Ratings

Source: TNS Media Korea

Awards 
2010 KBS Drama Awards
 Netizens' Award - Jang Keun-suk
 Popularity Award - Moon Geun-young
 Best Couple Award - Moon Geun-young and Jang Keun-suk

2011 Seoul International Drama Awards
 Outstanding Korean Actress - Moon Geun-young
 Excellent Korean Drama - Marry Me, Mary!

International broadcast
Despite low ratings in South Korea, the series was a huge hit in Japan in terms of both ratings and DVD sales. It aired there on cable channel DATV beginning February 16, 2011. This was followed by a popular run on terrestrial network TBS beginning May 20, 2011, due to the Korean Wave appeal of lead actor Jang Keun-suk.

It aired in the Middle East on MBC 4 beginning November 7, 2013, dubbed as Tazawajini ya Mary.

It aired in Thailand on Channel 7 beginning November 5, 2011, dubbed as Saojomjoon Kab Numindie, literally: Meddle Girl & Indie Boy.

It is currently airing in Chile on ETC Channel beginning May 15, 2017, dubbed as "Mary Está Fuera Por La Noche".

References

External links
  
 
 
 

Korean Broadcasting System television dramas
Korean-language television shows
2010 South Korean television series debuts
2010 South Korean television series endings
South Korean romantic comedy television series
Television shows based on South Korean webtoons
South Korean musical television series